Kundi may refer to:
 Kundi (film), Urdu film from Pakistan
 Kundi (harp)
 Kundi (Pashtun tribe), in Pakistan
 Kundi (stealing power), the practice of stealing electric power in some parts of India
 Kundi, Ethiopia, a town in Guradamole, Somali
 Kundi, Khyber Pakhtunkhwa, Pakistan
 An Assyrian fortress probably identical with later Cyinda